Ali Shamsher Khan (born 1 August 1989) is a Pakistani first-class cricketer who played for Sialkot cricket team.

References

External links
 

1989 births
Living people
Pakistani cricketers
Sialkot cricketers
Cricketers from Sialkot
Southern Punjab (Pakistan) cricketers
Sialkot Stallions cricketers
Khan Research Laboratories cricketers